Diocese of Bangalore may refer to:

 Bangalore Orthodox Diocese
 Roman Catholic Archdiocese of Bangalore